The 2006 Swedish Golf Tour, titled as the 2006 Telia Tour for sponsorship reasons, was the 23rd season of the Swedish Golf Tour.

Most tournaments also featured on the 2006 Nordic Golf League.

Schedule
The following table lists official events during the 2006 season.

Order of Merit
The Order of Merit was based on prize money won during the season, calculated using a points-based system.

See also
2006 Danish Golf Tour
2006 Finnish Tour
2006 Norwegian Golf Tour
2006 Swedish Golf Tour (women)

Notes

References

Swedish Golf Tour
Swedish Golf Tour